This list has been divided in
List of United States men's national weightlifting champions
List of United States women's national weightlifting champions